Patricia Danzon is an American economist, currently the Cecilia Moh Professor at Wharton School of the University of Pennsylvania.

References

Bibliography

Year of birth missing (living people)
Living people
University of Pennsylvania faculty
American economists
Alumni of the University of Oxford
University of Chicago alumni
Duke University faculty